Turtle Dreams is an album by American composer and vocalist Meredith Monk recorded in 1983 and released on the ECM New Series label. A choreographed version of the work premiered at the Plexus Club in Chelsea, Manhattan. A film version, directed by Ping Chong, was broadcast the same year on September 2, 1983, on WGBH in Boston, Massachusetts.

Inspiration

In the late 1970s Monk acquired a turtle named Neutron as a pet, and in 2016 said "When I first got her I had a lot of dreams about her, very strange dreams. And then I started thinking, how does a turtle think? What would a turtle mind be, and if she's sleeping, what would a turtle dream be?"

In a 2010 interview, Monk said she found standard music concerts boring, and said "at that time I started to try to feed in elements to that situation – like one little element of movement. Turtle Dreams is a music piece that has a very simplified movement component. I was working on that music myself, and then I thought 'wouldn't it be interesting if the movement had a totally simple counterpoint? So instead of standing there singing, what about if we went from side to side?' And from there, the piece seemed to make itself." She also added "When I was working on it I didn't realise some things that I see now. There's a certain fascist element to it, and I wasn't conscious of that at the time. ... There's a flatness, a surface style to the people, and maybe a kind of narcissism too."

The film version of the piece includes footage of turtles, initially in natural settings and then walking across a world map and through a miniature model of a Western city. This footage was photographed and directed by filmmaker Robert Withers.

Reception
AllMusic awarded the album four stars, with Ted Mills calling it "A daring display of vocal gymnastics and a journey back to childhood when all sounds were wondrous". After its premier John Rockwell of The New York Times wrote "The effect is rich, enigmatic and compelling."
	
Writing in 2010, Isla Leaver-Yap suggested Turtle Dreams is "one of Monk's most aggressive and direct works" and comments "The proximity of players to audience, and the blank stare that they deliver, push Turtle Dreams into a place of intimate hostility, where the emotional charge does not derive from the content but from the format and tone in the work."
	
In a survey of Monk's work for the newsletter "Tusk Is Better Than Rumors", the author assesses the different tracks on the album and concludes "'Turtle Dreams (waltz)' is the only one that really grabs my attention—'View 1' and 'View 2' are both very pretty and 'Engine Steps' and 'Ester's Song' are neat little curios, but 'Turtle Dreams' itself is an all-timer."
	
At Between Sound and Space, Tyran Grillo wrote "As with much of Monk's compositional work, what we get on this CD is only half the journey, complimented as it is by dance and imagery. The brief clips available online don't seem to do justice to the overall shape and feel of what I am sure is a far more inclusive live experience."

In 2020, interest in the performance piece was reignited after coverage by YouTube movie-review channel Red Letter Media, who featured a copy of the WGBH filmed version on their show "Best of the Worst". The group panned it, expressing confusion towards the intent of the performance, with co-host Rich Evans notably summarizing the video as "the most jaw-dropping cringe embarrassment I've ever seen," declaring that he holds it "in utter contempt."

Track listing
All compositions by Meredith Monk
 "Turtle Dreams (Waltz)" - 17:52   
 "View 1" - 10:13   
 "Engine Steps" - 2:03   
 "Ester's Song" - 1:14   
 "View 2" - 6:02 
Recorded in New York City (tracks 1 & 2), at Hanford Mills Museum, East Meredith in New York (track 3), and at Tonstudio Bauer in Ludwigsburg, West Germany (track 4 & 5)

Personnel
Meredith Monk – voice, piano, synthesizer, organ
Collin Walcott – didgeridoo (tracks 2–5), organ (track 1)
Julius Eastman – organ (track 1)
Steve Lockwood – organ (track 1)
Andrea Goodman – voice (track 1)
Paul Langland – voice (track 1)
Robert Een – voice (track 1)

References

1983 albums
Albums produced by Manfred Eicher
ECM New Series albums
Meredith Monk albums